The 1987–88 Sheffield Shield season was the 86th season of the Sheffield Shield, the domestic first-class cricket competition of Australia. Western Australia won the championship.

Table

Final

Statistics

Most Runs
Graeme Wood 1014

Most Wickets
Chris Matthews 56

References

Sheffield Shield
Sheffield Shield
Sheffield Shield seasons